Bae Young-Soo (Hangul: 배영수, Hanja: 裵英洙) (born May 4, 1981, in Daegu, South Korea) is a former South Korean starting pitcher who played 18 seasons in the KBO League. He batted and threw right-handed. He was well known as a franchise player for his former hometown club, the Samsung Lions.

In 2004, Bae finished the season with a record of 17-2, leading the KBO league in wins and winning percentage (.895), and won his first KBO MVP award, as well as the KBO League Golden Glove Award for pitcher nomination.

In 2005, Bae won the strikeout title and was runner-up in ERA (2.86) with a record of 11–11. After the season, he was named to the South Korean national team for the 2006 World Baseball Classic.

After 2014 season, Bae earned free agent status for the second time in his career. He failed to agree on a new contract with Samsung Lions within primal negotiation term, and this meant the end of Bae's fifteen years of commitment for the Lions. Seven days later Bae signed a three-year contract with Hanwha Eagles.

Bae played his final season in 2019 with the Doosan Bears. Bae finished his KBO League career in the top 10 of career victories and career strikeouts lists.

See also 
 List of KBO career win leaders
 List of KBO career strikeout leaders

External links 

Career statistics and player information from Korea Baseball Organization

1981 births
2006 World Baseball Classic players
KBO League Most Valuable Player Award winners
KBO League pitchers
Kyeongbuk High School alumni
Living people
Samsung Lions players
South Korean baseball players
Sportspeople from Daegu